Milsap Magic is the eleventh studio album by American country singer Ronnie Milsap, released in 1980 by RCA Records. The two A-side singles from the album, "Why Don't You Spend the Night" and "My Heart", reached No. 1 on the Billboard country chart, and two B-sides, "Silent Night (After the Fight)" and "Misery Loves Company", also received airplay as double-sided singles. The song "If You Don't Want Me To", which was later used as a B-side in 1987 and 1989, was then issued as the first single for Milsap's 2011 Country Again album, in its original production (not a re-recording) but as a longer version with an extra chorus inserted before the instrumental fade.

Track listing

Personnel
Acoustic Guitar: Jimmy Capps, Steve Chapman, Bruce Dees, Jack Watkins
Bass guitar: Warren Gowers, Mike Leech
Drums: Kenny Buttrey, Rick Connell, Larrie Londin, Kenny Malone, Buster Phillips
Electric Guitar: Pete Bordonali, Bruce Dees, Reggie Young
Harmonica: Charlie McCoy
Keyboards: Beegie Adair, David Briggs, Ronnie Milsap, Bobby Ogdin, Hargus "Pig" Robbins, Keith Thomas, Bobby Wood
Percussion: Kenny Malone, Ronnie Milsap, Farrell Morris
Steel Guitar: Hal Rugg
Strings: Sheldon Kurland Strings
Upright Bass: Bob Moore
Vibraphone: Charlie McCoy
Lead Vocals: Ronnie Milsap
Background Vocals: Bruce Dees, Ronnie Milsap, Shari Kramer Singers, Lea Jane Singers
String and Horn Arranger: D. Bergen White

Charts

Weekly charts

Year-end charts

References

Ronnie Milsap albums
1980 albums
RCA Records albums